Valila (also Romanized as Valīlā; also known as Valbalā) is a village in Kaseliyan Rural District, in the Central District of Savadkuh County, Mazandaran Province, Iran. At the 2006 census, its population was 47, in 22 families.

References 

Populated places in Savadkuh County